The Harrer Building is a historic building located at 8051 North Lincoln Avenue in Skokie, Illinois.

Description and history 
Michael Harrer, a Bavarian immigrant, built the building in 1874 for his family's home and his meat market. Harrer's meat market was the first in the village, then known as Niles Center, and the building is the oldest extant commercial building in Skokie. In addition, the building's Italianate style architecture is unique among Skokie commercial buildings. The Harrer family played a significant role in the development of Niles Center; Michael Harrer was a village trustee, and his son Adam was the first village president.

It was added to the National Register of Historic Places on February 17, 1983.

References

Buildings and structures on the National Register of Historic Places in Cook County, Illinois
Italianate architecture in Illinois
Commercial buildings completed in 1874
Skokie, Illinois
Commercial buildings on the National Register of Historic Places in Illinois
1874 establishments in Illinois